Cochylimorpha decolorella is a species of moth of the family Tortricidae. It is found on the Canary Islands and in Portugal, Spain, France, Bulgaria, as well as on Corsica, Sardinia, Sicily, Malta and Madeira. Outside of Europe, it is found in Morocco, Egypt, Turkey and the Near East.

The wingspan is 18–24 mm. Adults have been recorded on wing from January to May.

References

Moths described in 1839
Cochylimorpha
Moths of Europe
Moths of Africa
Moths of Asia